Kim Mun-geun (Hangul: 김문근, Hanja: 金汶根; 25 November 1801 – 6 November 1863), posthumously called Duke Chungsung (충숭공, 忠純公), was a Korean nobleman and politician during the late Joseon Period, who served as chief of Yeongdonnyeong (영돈녕부사) and Chongyung (총융사) and as a training commander (훈련대장).  He was also the father of Queen Cheorin, primary wife of King Cheoljong. 

He was one of the famous political figures who came from the Andong Kim clan and was a 7th degree nephew of Kim Jo-sun, Internal Prince Yeongan (김조순 영안부원군); the father of Queen Sunwon. When his daughter was chosen as Queen, he was honoured as Internal Prince Yeongeun (영은부원군, 永恩府院君). After his son-in-law's death, he was appointed Chief State Councillor (의정부 영의정).

Biography

Early life
Kim Mun-geun was born on November 25, 1801 as the son of Kim In-sun (김인순) and his wife, Lady Shin of the Pyeongsan Shin clan (평산 신씨). He was the great-grandson of Kim Seong-haeng (김성행), who was executed for supporting Prince Yeoning during the reign of King Gyeongjong. He was later adopted by Kim Yi-sun (김이순).

Kim married Lady Yi of the Yeonan Yi clan (daughter of Yi Yong-su), but she died early, without any issue. She was later honoured as Internal Princess Yeonyang (연양부부인).

For the second time, he married Lady Min of the Yeoheung Min clan (daughter of Min Beon-hyeon). With her, he had one son and one daughter (the future Queen Cheorin).

In 1848, he was appointed and become a military officer.

Later life
Kim died on November 6, 1863, one year before his son-in-law's death. His tomb was located in Galhyeon, Gwacheon-gun, Gyeonggi-do, but was later moved to Chohyeon-ri 167–1, Daesin-myeon, Yeoju-gun, Gyeonggi-do, South Korea. His tombstone was written by Kim Byeong-guk (김병국), in January 1864.

Family
 Great-Great-Great-Great-Great-Great-Great-Great-Grandfather
 Kim Saeng-hae (김생해, 金生海)
 Great-Great-Great-Great-Great-Great-Great-Grandfather
 Kim Geuk-hyo (김극효, 金克孝) (16 September 1542 - 3 February 1618)
 Great-Great-Great-Great-Great-Great-Great-Grandmother
 Lady Jeong of the Dongrae Jeong clan (본관: 동래정씨)
 Great-Great-Great-Great-Great-Great-Grandfather
 Kim Sang-gwon (김상관, 金尙觀)
 Great-Great-Great-Great-Great-Grandfather
 Kim Gwang-chan (김광찬, 金光燦) (1597 - 24 February 1668)
 Great-Great-Great-Great-Great-Grandmother
 Lady Kim of the Yeonan Kim clan (본관: 연안 김씨)
 Great-Great-Great-Great-Grandfather
 Kim Su-hang (김수항, 金壽恒) (1629 - 9 April 1689)
 Great-Great-Great-Great-Grandmother
 Lady Na of the Anjeong Na clan (본관: 안정 나씨)
 Great-Great-Great-Grandfather
 Kim Chang-jib (김창집, 金昌集) (1648 - 2 May 1722)
 Great-Great-Great-Grandmother
 Lady Park (박씨)
 Great-Great-Grandfather 
 Kim Je-gyeom (김제겸, 金濟謙)
 Great-Grandfather
 Kim Seong-haeng (김성행, 金省行)
 Grandfather
 Kim Yi-jik (김이직, 金履直)
 Father
 Kim In-sun (김인순, 金麟淳)
 Adoptive uncle - Kim Yi-sun (김이순, 金頤淳)
 Mother
 Stepmother - Lady Yi of the Hansan Yi clan (한산 이씨)
 Stepmother - Lady Yi of the Jeonju Yi clan (전주 이씨)
 Step-grandfather - Yi Gwon-su (이관수)
 Biological mother - Lady Shin of the Pyeongsan Shin clan (평산 신씨)
 Grandfather - Shin Il-sik (신일식, 申日式)
Siblings
 Older brother - Kim Jun-geun (김준근, 金浚根)
Older brother - Kim Su-geun (김수근, 金洙根) (1798 - 1854)
Sister-in-law - Lady Jo (조씨); daughter of Jo Jin-Taek (조진택)
 Nephew - Kim Byeong-hak (김병학, 金炳學) (1821 - 1879)
 Niece-in-law - Lady Yun of the Paepyeong Yun clan (파평 윤씨)
 Niece-in-law - Lady Yun of the Paepyeong Yun clan (파평 윤씨)
 Niece-in-law - Lady Yi of the Seongju Yi clan (성주 이씨)
 Adoptive grandnephew - Kim Seung-gyu (김승규, 金昇圭); son of Kim Byeong-yu (김병유, 金炳儒)
 Nephew - Kim Byeong-guk (김병국, 金炳國) (1825 - 1905)
 Adoptive grandnephew - Kim Jeong-gyu (김정규, 金貞圭); son of Kim Byeong-mun (김병문, 金炳聞)
Wives and their issue(s)
 Internal Princess Consort Yeonyang of the Yeonan Yi clan (연양부부인 연안 이씨, 延陽府夫人 延安 金氏) (1799 - 1824) — No issue.
 Internal Princess Consort Heungyang of the Yeoheung Min clan (흥양부부인 여흥 민씨, 興陽府夫人 驪興 閔氏) (? - 1872) 
 Daughter - Queen Cheorin of the Andong Kim clan (27 April 1837 - 12 June 1878) (철인왕후 안동 김씨)
 Son-in-law - Cheoljong of Joseon (25 July 1831 - 16 January 1864) (조선 철종왕)
 Grandson - Prince Royal Yi Yong-jun (22 November 1858 - 25 May 1859) (원자 이융준)
 Son - Kim Byeong-pil (김병필, 金炳弼) (1839 - 1870)
 Grandson - Kim Heung-gyu (김흥규, 金興圭)
 Great-Grandson - Kim Yong-jin (김용진, 金容鎭); adopted by Kim Jeong-Gyu (김정규)

Titles and ranks
November 25, 1801 – 1841: Kim Mun-geun (김문근, 金汶根)
1841 – 1851: Governor (현감)
From 1851: Internal Prince Yeongeun (영은부원군, 永恩府院君)
1851 – before November 6, 1863:
Head of Yeongdonnyeong (영돈녕부사)
Head of Chongyungsa (총융사)
Training Commander (훈련대장)
From 1863: Chief State Councillor (영의정, 領議政)

In popular culture
 Portrayed by Jeon Bae-soo in the 2020 TVN TV series Mr. Queen.

See also
Cheoljong of Joseon
Queen Cheorin
Kim Jwa-Geun
Mr. Queen

References

1801 births
1863 deaths
Andong Kim clan